Thylacopteris is a genus of ferns in the family Polypodiaceae, subfamily Microsoroideae, according to the Pteridophyte Phylogeny Group classification of 2016 (PPG I).

Taxonomy
Thylacopteris was first described by John Smith in 1875 with the name attributed to Gustav Kunze. No species placed in Thylacopteris were included in a molecular phylogenetic study of the subfamily Microsoroideae in 2019, so the relationship with other genera is unclear.

Species
, the Checklist of Ferns and Lycophytes of the World recognized the following species:
Thylacopteris diaphana (Brause) Copel.
Thylacopteris papillosa (Blume) Kunze ex J.Sm.

References

Polypodiaceae
Fern genera